Chess has been contested at the African Games since the 2003 Games in Abuja, except for the 2015 Games in Brazzaville. The chess events have included individual and team events for men and women.

The open team event at the African Games is the successor of the African Team Chess Championship: the winner of the event gains the right to participate at the next World Team Chess Championship. The African Team Chess Championship was only held twice in Cairo in 1993 and 1997, and Egypt won both times.

Editions

Medal table

References

External links
 All-Africa Games' (chess - men) Overall Statistics 2003-2011 - olimpbase.org
 All-Africa Games' (chess - women) Overall Statistics 2003-2011 - olimpbase.org

 
Sports at the African Games
All-Africa Games
All-Africa Games